La Sonnambula (The Sleepwalker) is a ballet by the co-founder and ballet master of New York City Ballet, George Balanchine, made to Vittorio Rieti's music using themes from the operas of Vincenzo Bellini including La Sonnambula, Norma, I Puritani and I Capuleti e i Montecchi (1830–35).

The ballet premiered as The Night Shadow  with the Ballet Russe de Monte Carlo on Wednesday, 27 February 1946, at City Center of Music and Drama, New York, with sets and costumes designed by Dorothea Tanning and costumes executed by Karinska. It was first performed by the New York City Ballet on 6 January 1960 at City Center of Music and Drama.  

The ballet tells the story of a Coquette, a Poet, and a beautiful Sleepwalker. The original 1946 program describes the story as follows: Amid the somber walls of a decaying castle a masked ball has just begun.  The host, an eccentric nobleman, receives his guests, among them a poet and a dazzling coquette.  The poet, seduced by her charms, dances with her as the guests gradually leave the scene, then she too leaves.  As the poet turns to follow, he sees a lovely white apparition gliding across the roofs toward him.  It comes nearer and he sees that it is a beautiful somnambulist.  He loses his heart to her at once, unaware that she is the wife of the host who keeps her locked away from the world.  They dance, and he sees to join her in her realm of dreaming sleep.  But they are seen.  The coquette, flushed with jealousy, steals out to tell the host....All too soon the marvelous sleep-walker drifts away.  The poet would follow her but the guests reenter and their dancing forms a barrier.  Finally, he breaks through and disappears but the host follows too and stabs him.  As he lies unconscious among the terrified guests the white figure of his love appears once more, gently raises him and together they glide away.

The ballet was renamed La Sonnambula in 1961, and has been revived numerous times.

Original cast
Alexandra Danilova
Maria Tallchief
Ruthanna Boris
Frederic Franklin 
Leon Danielian 
Marie-Jeanne
Nicholas Magallanes
Michel Katcharoff

References 
  Souvenir Program for the Ballet Russe de Monte Carlo 1946-47 season.  New York: General Program Corporation, 1946.
 Playbill, New York City Ballet, Friday, 20 June 2008
 Repertory Week, New York City Ballet, Spring Season, 2008 repertory, week 8

Reviews 
John Martin, "BALANCHINE DANCE IN WORLD PREMIERE; 'Night Shadow' Introduced by Ballet Russe at City Center --Music From Operas", New York Times, 28 February 1946
Allen Hughes, "Ballet: 'La Sonnambula'; City Troupe Adds a Balanchine Dance to Repertory at State Theater", New York Times, 7 January 1965
Alastair Macaulay, Four Distinct Dream Worlds, Sharing the Same Language of Classical Ballet, New York Times, 19 January 2008
Deborah Jowitt, review, Village Voice, 5 February 2008

External links  
Entry for La Sonnambula at the Balanchine Trust website

Ballets by George Balanchine
New York City Ballet repertory
1946 ballet premieres
Ballets by Vittorio Rieti
Ballets designed by Barbara Karinska
Ballets to the music of Vincenzo Bellini
Adaptations of works by Eugène Scribe